Tripneustes parkinsoni is a species of sea urchins belonging to the family Toxopneustidae. These sea urchins have been recorded as fossils on the Miocene of southern France (abt. 20 Ma).

References

Toxopneustidae
Fossil taxa described in 1846